Tom Elmhirst (born 8 June 1971) is a British mix engineer. He has worked with artists including Adele, Beck, David Bowie, Cage the Elephant, Lady Gaga, Residente, and Amy Winehouse, among many others. Elmhirst has received numerous accolades and nominations. He has won sixteen Grammy Awards, a Latin Grammy Award, a Primetime Emmy Award, and two Music Producers Guild Awards for Mix Engineer of the Year. Having won six trophies at the 59th Annual Grammy Awards in 2017, he set the record for the most Grammys won by an engineer or mixer in one night.

Elmhirst currently works out of Electric Lady Studios in New York City.

Awards and nominations

Selected production credits

2000s

 2003: Black Cherry - Goldfrapp
 2003: Frank - Amy Winehouse
 2004: Lifeblood - Manic Street Preachers
 2005: Nightbird - Erasure
 2006: The Warning - Hot Chip
 2006: Alright, Still - Lily Allen
 2006: These Streets - Paolo Nutini 
 2006: Back to Black - Amy Winehouse
 2007: Version - Mark Ronson 
 2007: Overpowered - Róisín Murphy 
 2008: 19 - Adele
 2008: Midnight Boom - The Kills

2010s

 2010: The Sea - Corinne Bailey Rae
 2011: 21 - Adele
 2011: Ceremonials - Florence & The Machine
 2011: El Camino - The Black Keys
 2012: Our Version of Events - Emile Sande
 2012: "Skyfall" (single) - Adele
 2013: Sing to the Moon - Laura Mvula
 2013: Halcyon Days - Ellie Goulding
 2013: Reflektor - Arcade Fire
 2014: Morning Phase - Beck
 2015: Uptown Special - Mark Ronson 
 2015: Mr Wonderful - Action Bronson
 2015: At. Long. Last - A$AP Rocky
 2015: In Colour - Jamie xx
 2015: Blood - Lianne La Havas
 2015: 25 - Adele
 2015: Tell Me I'm Pretty - Cage the Elephant
 2016: Blackstar - David Bowie
 2016: 32 Levels - Clams Casino
 2016: Endless - Frank Ocean 
 2016: Blonde - Frank Ocean
 2016: Joanne - Lady Gaga
 2017: Residente - Residente
 2017: Truth Is a Beautiful Thing  - London Grammar
 2017: Melodrama - Lorde
 2017: Visions of a Life - Wolf Alice
 2017: Masseduction - St. Vincent
 2017: "The Joke" (single) - Brandi Carlile
 2017: Rest - Charlotte Gainsbourg
 2018: Electric Light - James Bay
 2018: High as Hope - Florence and the Machine 
 2018: A Star Is Born - Lady Gaga & Bradley Cooper
 2018: Delta - Mumford & Sons
 2019: Scenery - Emily King
 2019: To Believe - The Cinematic Orchestra
 2019: Begin Again - Norah Jones
 2019: Social Cues - Cage the Elephant
 2019: Arizona Baby - Kevin Abstract
 2019: Late Night Feelings - Mark Ronson
 2019: III - Banks
 2019: The Center Won't Hold - Sleater-Kinney
 2019: GINGER - BROCKHAMPTON
 2019: Why Me? Why Not. - Liam Gallagher

2020s

 2020: Women in Music Pt. III - HAIM
 2020: What Could Possibly Go Wrong - Dominic Fike
 2021: Californian Soil - London Grammar
 2021: Path of Wellness - Sleater-Kinney
 2021: In These Silent Days - Brandi Carlile
 2021: 30 - Adele

References

External links
 

1971 births
Living people
British audio engineers
British record producers
Grammy Award winners
Latin Grammy Award winners
Primetime Emmy Award winners